Events during the year 1103 in Italy.

Deaths
 Humbert II, Count of Savoy
 Sybilla of Conversano

Sources
 Detlev Schwennicke, Europäische Stammtafeln: Stammtafeln zur Geschichte der Europäischen Staaten, Neue Folge, Band II (Marburg, Germany: Verlag von J. A. Stargardt, 1984), Tafel 81
 Charles Wendell David, Robert Curthose, Duke of Normandy (Cambridge, MA: Harvard University Press, 1920), p. 146 
 William M. Aird, Robert Curthose Duke of Normandy (Woodbridge: The Boydell Press, 2008), pp. 191–2
 François Neveux, The Normans, Trans. Howard Curtis (London: Constable & Robinson, Ltd., 2008), p. 174
 Ordericus Vitalis, The Ecclesiastical History of England and Normandy, Trans. Thomas Forester, Vol. III (London: Henry G. Bohn, 1854), p. 272
 C. Warren Hollister, Henry I (Yale University Press, New Haven & London, 2003), p. 180
 William M. Aird, Robert Curthose Duke of Normandy (Woodbridge: The Boydell Press, 2008), p. 212
 William M. Aird, Robert Curthose Duke of Normandy (Woodbridge: The Boydell Press, 2008), p. 213
 Katherine Lack, Conqueror's Son: Duke Robert Curthose, Thwarted King (Sutton Publishing, 2007), p. 153

References

Years of the 12th century in Italy
Italy
Italy